This is a record of Senegal's results at the FIFA World Cup. The FIFA World Cup, sometimes called the Football World Cup or the Soccer World Cup, but usually referred to simply as the World Cup, is an international association football competition contested by the men's national teams of the members of Fédération Internationale de Football Association (FIFA), the sport's global governing body. The championship has been awarded every four years since the first tournament in 1930, except in 1942 and 1946, due to World War II.

The tournament consists of two parts, the qualification phase and the final phase (officially called the World Cup Finals). The qualification phase, which currently take place over the three years preceding the Finals, is used to determine which teams qualify for the Finals. The current format of the Finals involves 32 teams competing for the title, at venues within the host nation (or nations) over a period of about a month. The World Cup Finals is the most widely viewed sporting event in the world, with an estimated 715.1 million people watching the 2006 tournament final.

Senegal have qualified for the World Cup on three occasions, in 2002 where they reached the quarter-finals, 2018 and in 2022. At the 2018 World Cup, they were the first team in World Cup history to be eliminated using the fair play rule after being tied with Japan on the first six tiebreakers.

World Cup record

Senegal at the 2002 FIFA World Cup

Squad

Group A

Defending champions France were eliminated from Group A without scoring a goal after defeats to Denmark and debutants Senegal, who both progressed at the expense of two-time champions Uruguay.

Round of 16

Quarter-finals

Senegal at the 2018 FIFA World Cup

Squad

Group H

Senegal at the 2022 FIFA World Cup

Group stage

Knockout stage

Round of 16

Record players

Matches

Top goalscorers 

Current as of 29 November 2022 after the match v Ecuador

References

 
Countries at the FIFA World Cup